The Sapera are a Muslim community found in the state of Bihar in India. They are also known as Mastan and Ustad.

Origin

The Muslim Sapera are Muslim converts from the Hindu Sapera caste. Little is known about the exact circumstances of their conversion to Islam. Sapera in Hindi means snake charmer. Their traditional occupation is snake charming, and they are one of a number of nomadic groups found in North India who might be the ancestors of the Romani community of Europe. The Sapera speak a dialect which is a mixture of Urdu, Hindi and Maithili.

Present circumstances

The Muslim Sapera are found in the districts of Saharsa, Champaran, Sitamarhi and Purnea. They are divided into two groups, the Iraqis and Iranis. Both these groups are strictly endogamous, and there is no intermarriage between them. Traditionally a community of snake charmers, most Sapera are now wage labourers, and are one of the most disadvantaged groups among the Bihari Muslims.

See also

 Sapera dance
 Sapera

References

Dalit Muslim
Indian castes
Muslim communities of India
Muslim communities of Bihar
Social groups of Bihar
Dom in India
Romani in India